Cowards is a 1970 American drama film written and directed by Simon Nuchtern about the then-topical issue of draft evasion in the Vietnam War. It was screened at the Cannes Film Festival in 1970.

Following the commercial failure of Cowards, the film was re-edited with newly-shot erotic scenes featuring unrelated actors, and was reissued under the title Love-In '72  so that it could be remarketed as a sexploitation film. Nuchtern's name was removed from the credits of the recut version; the direction of Love-In '72 was credited to Sidney Knight and Karl Hansen, and the writing to Jay Robins.

Plot 
A young man must decide whether to flee the U.S. draft and move to Canada, or stay or go fight for his country in Vietnam.

Cast 
 John Ross as Phillip Haller
 Susan Sparling as Joan Boyd
 Will Patent as Peter Yates
 Tom Murphy as Howard Yates
 Philip Baker Hall as Father Reis
 Alexander Gellman as Gregory Haller
 Spalding Gray as Radical at party

Additional cast in Love-In '72 version:
 Linda Southern as Sunny 
 Daniel Nugent as Steve

Reception 
Reviews of Cowards were mixed to negative. Roger Greenspun of The New York Times said he "liked" Cowards despite it being "one of the squarest, most unashamedly flat‐footed films of the year," and praised the performances of John Ross and Susan Sparling. The New York Daily News said that "at best, the drama is talky and labored." TV Guide dismissed it as "inept" and "a film best forgotten."

Reviewing the DVD release of the Love-In '72 cut for Something Weird Video, Frank Henenlotter wrote "Eagle-eyed viewers will enjoy spotting two now-mainstream actors in small, incendiary roles: Philip Baker Hall plays the priest who preaches the gospel of civil disobedience, while monologuist Spalding Grey is alternately funny and scary as a psycho terrorist babbling at a party."

References

External links 
 
 
 
 

1970 films
American drama films
American sexploitation films
1970s English-language films
1970s American films